Louis Fan Siu-wong (born 19 June 1973) is a Hong Kong actor and martial artist. He is best known worldwide for his starring role as Ricky in Riki-Oh: The Story of Ricky (1991) and as Jin Shanzhao in Ip Man (2008) and Ip Man 2 (2010), as well as roles in numerous television series produced by TVB.

Biography

Fan is the son of Fan Mei-sheng, an actor contracted to the Shaw Brothers Studio. When he was 14, his father sent him to Xuzhou, China, to learn gymnastics and wushu.

After completing his studies, Fan returned to the Hong Kong film industry, and starred in Stanley Tong's Stone Age Warriors (1991). In 1992, at the age of 18, Fan portrayed the titular character in Riki-Oh: The Story of Ricky, a Hong Kong film based on the manga Riki-Oh. He claims that the director and producers of the film met him at the Hong Kong Airport upon arrival and immediately offered him the role. Being a young, up-and-coming actor, he took the role without knowing what it was. He later said he was shocked to discover how bloody and violent the Riki-Oh manga was.

Fan was a contract artiste under the Hong Kong television station TVB throughout the 1990s, and he starred in several television dramas, including Demi-Gods and Semi-Devils (1997) and Young Hero Fang Shiyu (1999). He left TVB in the 2000s, and appeared in several Taiwanese and mainland Chinese television series before focusing on films.

One of his most memorable film performances in the 2000s was as Jin Shanzhao, the tough Northern martial artist in the 2008 martial arts film Ip Man, which starred Donnie Yen as Wing Chun grandmaster Ip Man. Fan's performance in Ip Man earned him a nomination for Best Supporting Actor at the 28th Hong Kong Film Awards in 2009. He reprised his role as Jin Shanzhao in Ip Man 2, the 2010 sequel to Ip Man. He also portrayed a new character in The Legend Is Born – Ip Man (2010), another movie about Yip Man that is unrelated to Ip Man and Ip Man 2.

In 2018, Fan made his proper Hollywood movie debut in the film Attrition (2018) starring alongside Steven Seagal as an ally helping Seagal's character to take down a human trafficking cartel in Thailand.

Personal life
Louis has a daughter, and a son named Alan, from his previous girlfriend; they broke up in 2002. In 2012, he began dating actress and singer JJ Jia. After announcing their engagement, the two were married on January 1, 2016 in a private ceremony in Hong Kong. In November 2017, they had a daughter, nicknamed Little Rice Bowl.

Filmography

Film

 Amsterdam Connection (1978) - Fannie's Little Brother
 Descendant of the Sun (1983)
 The Master Strikes Back (1985) - Tung Hsiao Feng
 Goodbye Mammie (1986)
 Immortal Story (1986) - Li Wen Chi (teenager)
 Righting Wrongs (1986) - Yu Chi-Wen / Sammy
 Silent Love (1986) - Little Dragon
 Dragons of the Orient (1988)
 Stone Age Warriors (1991) - Lung Fei
 Riki-Oh: The Story of Ricky (1991) - Riki-Oh Saiga
 Chu sheng zhi du (1993)
 Once a Cop (1993) - Alan Wong
 Organized Crime and Triad Bureau (1994) - Tak
 Master of Zen (1994) - Son Kwong / Wei Ho
 Fearless Match (1994)
 Portrait of a Serial Rapist (1994) - Policeman
 Water Tank Murder Mystery (1994)
 Chak wong (1995) - Smarty
 Twist (1995, Short)
 Informer (1995)
 The Death Games (1997)
 Unbeatables (2000)
 Huo wu yao yang (2001)
 Spy Gear (2001)
 The Story of Freeman (2001) - Loon
 Legend of Black Mask (2001) - Yung Chi Lieh / Death
 Shadow Mask (2001) - Fu Tien-Ming / Shadow Mask
 Hei se lei tai (2002) - Alex Wong
 Flying Dragon, Leaping Tiger (2002) - Bai Xiao Hu
 Invincible (2003)
 Lethal Cop (2003)
 Hot & Spicy (2003)
 The Boxing King (2003)
 Shaolin vs. Evil Dead (2004)  - Hak / Brother Black
 Kung Fu Fighter (2007) - Sam Long
 Wu Seng (2007) - Yang Wu
 Shao Lin jiang shi tian ji (2007) - Dragon Zhao / Steed Zhao
 The Moss (2008) - Beggar
 Connected (2008) - Tong
 Butterfly Lovers (2008)
 Ip Man (2008) - Jin
 Give Love (2009)
 Kung Fu Chefs (2009) - Wong Kai Joe
 On His Majesty's Secret Service (2009) - Lord Unicorn
 Split Second Murders (2009) - Brother Guo
 Just Another Pandora's Box (2010) - Zhang Fei
 Beauty on Duty! (2010) - Donnie Yuen
 Future X-Cops (2010) - Kalong
 Ip Man 2 (2010) - Jin Shan Zhao / Kam Shan-Chau
 The Legend is Born – Ip Man (2010) - Ip Tin-chi / Tanaka Eiketsu
 Flirting Scholar 2 (2010) - Grand Master
 A Chinese Ghost Story (2011) - Ha Suet Fung Lui
 The Flying Swords of Dragon Gate (2011) - Ma Jinliang
 Choy Lee Fut Kung Fu (2011)
 On My Way (2012)
 Palace (2012)
 Wu Dang (2012) - Shui Heyi
 Pay Back (2013)
 The Monkey King (2014) - Juling Shen
 Unbeatable Youth (2014)
 Fight for Glory (2014)
 Kung Fu Jungle (aka Kung Fu Killer) (2014) - Hung Yip
 Bounty Hunters (2016) - Bao Bao
 Return of Wukong (2017)
 The Bravest Escort Group (2018)
 Te zhong shi ming (2018) - Wuyou
 The Big Holy Demon (2018)
 Monster Undersea (2018)
 Monster Undersea 2 (2018)
 Attrition (2018) - Chen Man
 The Great Sage Sun Wukong (2019) - Sun Wukong
 Nocturnal Girl (2019)
 Big Trouble in Dragon Palace (2019)
 Taoist Master (2020)
 Taoist Master: Kylin (2020)

Television

 Fist of Power (1995)
 The Hitman Chronicles (1996)
 Justice Sung (1997)
 Weapons of Power (1997)
 Demi-Gods and Semi-Devils (1997) - Hui-juk
 The New Shaolin Temple (1998)
 Young Hero Fong Sai Yuk (1999) - Hong Xiguan
 In the Realm of Fancy (2003)
 Xin Yi Jian Mei (2009)
 Beijing Love Story (2011)
 The Legend of Chu Liuxiang (2012)
 Beauties of the Emperor (2012) - Zi Ren
 The Bride with White Hair (2012)
The Flying Swords of Dragon Gate (2015)
 Legend of Zu Mountain (2015)
 The Heavenly Sword and the Dragon-Slaying Sabre (2019)

See also 

 Hong Kong action cinema
 Cinema of China

References

External links

Louis Fan on Weibo

Siu Wong Fan at Douban

Separately listed as: .

Louis Fan on HK Cinemagic

1973 births
Living people
Hong Kong people of Shandong descent
20th-century Hong Kong male actors
21st-century Hong Kong male actors
Hong Kong male film actors
Hong Kong wushu practitioners